Listerfehrda is a village and a former municipality in Wittenberg district in Saxony-Anhalt, Germany. Since 1 January 2011, it is part of the town Zahna-Elster. Before that the municipality belonged to the administrative municipality (Verwaltungsgemeinschaft) of Elbaue-Fläming.

Geography
Listerfehrda lies about 17 km southeast of Lutherstadt Wittenberg on the Elbe.

Economy and transportation
Federal Highway (Bundesstraße) B 187 between Wittenberg and Jessen runs right through the community.

References

Former municipalities in Saxony-Anhalt
Zahna-Elster